was a Japanese actor and voice actor from Toshima, Tokyo. He was the founder of the Shiki Theatre Company. He remarried with actress Fujiko Kimura in 2010.

Roles

Live action films
Assassination (1964) (Narahara Shigeru)
Honoo to onna (Flame and Women) (1967)
The Petrified Forest (1973)
Fumō chitai (1976) (Koide)
Tempo suikō-den (1976)
Antarctica (1983) (Hokkaidō University professor)
Deaths in Tokimeki (1984)
Those Swell Yakuza (1988)
Teito Taisen (1989) (Fumimaro Konoe)
Noh Mask Murders (1991)
Mr. Moonlight (1991)
Maadadayo (1993) (Doctor Kobayashi)
Kaettekite Kogarashi Monjiro (1993)
Shin sarariiman senka (1997)
Mars Sweet Home (2000)

Live action television
 Ten to Chi to (1969) (Sanjōnishi Sanezumi)
 Naruto Hichō (1977–78) (Zeami)
 Ōoku (1983) (Ryūkō)
 Ōedo Sōsamō (1984) (Narrator)
 Sanga Moyu (1984)

Anime television
Ginga Eiyū Densetsu (Document voiceover (episode 56))

Theater
The Cherry Orchard
Hamlet
The Merchant of Venice
Alderle or a saint
Antigone
Troy war will not happen
Orphe and Yuriddis
lark
Understand and accumulate!
Whose life？
Equus
Sluice
Hikarigoke
Yuriddis
Ondine
A man who sells memories
Rokumeikan
Anne of Green Gables
beauty and the beast
Devil and God’'

Theatrical animationStreet Fighter II: The Animated Movie (Vega)Twilight of the CockroachesDubbing roles
Live action99 and 44/100% Dead (Harry Crown)Amadeus (Antonio Salieri)Avalon (Game Master)The Cassandra Crossing (Doctor Jonathan Chamberlain)Columbo (Robert Conrad)Hannibal (TV Asahi edition) (Hannibal Lecter)Les Misérables (Inspector Javert)Sitting Bull (Major Robert Parrish)The Thief of Paris (Georges Randal)The Untouchables (Eliot Ness)
AnimationThe Hunchback of Notre Dame (Judge Claude Frollo (speaking voice))SWAT Kats: The Radical Squadron'' (Dr. Harley Street)

Honors 
Medal with Purple Ribbon (1996)
Order of the Rising Sun, 4th Class, Gold Rays with Rosette (2002)
Art Festival Award- Incentive award
Arts Reward - Minister of Education Award
Kinokuniya Theater Award

References

External links 
Profile

1931 births
2017 deaths
Japanese male stage actors
Japanese male voice actors
Male voice actors from Tokyo
Recipients of the Medal with Purple Ribbon
Recipients of the Order of the Rising Sun, 4th class
20th-century Japanese male actors
21st-century Japanese male actors